Duncan Ross MacRae (14 April 1934 – 2 May 2019) was a New Zealand rugby league footballer. A , he was a member of the Kiwis on their 1956 tour of Australia, playing in three tests.

MacRae was born on 14 April 1934, and died in Auckland on 2 May 2019.

References

1934 births
2019 deaths
New Zealand rugby league players
New Zealand national rugby league team players
Rugby league props